Baal is a Danish rock band formed in 1994 in Copenhagen. Besides their studio records, Baal has also created music for three musicals. Baal started out as a David Bowie cover band under a different name, and later changed name to Baal and started writing their own music.

Discography

Studio albums

Musical albums

Live records

Other appearances
In 1995, Baal appeared on a record from Danish National Television, called Coming Up, with a set of new Danish artists. Baal appeared as track number one with "Chronical Love Song", later to be found on the Sensorama album.

In 1997, Baal created the title song for the Danish film Eye of the Eagle, titled "Silent Eye". This song was released as a single containing three different versions of the song along with a film music suite.

References

English translation of references
1. Translation of reference 1 (Google)

External links 
 

Danish rock music groups
Musical groups established in 1994
1994 establishments in Denmark
Musical groups from Copenhagen